The Disobedient Son (Spanish:El hijo desobediente) is a 1945 Mexican comedy film directed by Humberto Gómez Landero and starring Germán Valdés, Marcelo Chávez and Delia Magaña.

Cast
 Germán Valdés as Germán Rico / Tin Tan
 Marcelo Chávez as Marcelo Fortuna
 Cuquita Escobar as Cuca
 Delia Magaña  as Socorro
 Miguel Arenas as Don Placido
 Tony Díaz as Ángel
 Natalia Ortiz as Doña Dadivosa Matafortuna
 Luis G. Barreiro as Delegado
 Rafael Icardo as Don Modesto Rojas
 Salvador Quiroz as Don Rogaciano Rico
 Alfredo Varela padre as Conductor tren
 Ramón G. Larrea as Dueño de cabaret
 Humberto Rodríguez
 Rita María Bauzá
 Marga López as Mesera del Cabaret 
 Leonor Gómez as Mujer en cabaret

References

Bibliography 
 Maria Herrera-Sobek. Celebrating Latino Folklore: An Encyclopedia of Cultural Traditions. ABC-CLIO, 2012.

External links 
 

1945 films
1945 comedy films
Mexican comedy films
1940s Spanish-language films
Films directed by Humberto Gómez Landero
Mexican black-and-white films
1940s Mexican films